Get Help, known as Contact Support before the Windows 10 Creators Update, is a built-in interface for communicating with Microsoft customer service employees over the Internet. The opening screen requests that the user specify a product and explain a problem with it. It also offers the user links to online help articles for business and IT support, Microsoft Store sales and support, and a disability answer desk.

Once a problem has been entered, the user is offered a chance to review that and select a product from the following icon-based list:

Windows
Office
Xbox
Office for Mac, iOS, or Android
Skype
OneDrive
Microsoft Store
Excel
PowerPoint
Word
Outlook
OneNote
Azure
Band
Microsoft Rewards
Business, IT & developer
Dynamics
Edge
Exchange server
HealthVault
HoloLens
Internet Explorer
Minecraft Education
Mobile Devices
Mouse, keyboard
MSDN Subscriptions
MSN
Outlook.com
SharePoint server
SQL Server
Surface
Visio
Visual Studio

After the user has selected a product category, the next screen presents links for solving the problem, device information, a call link with an estimated wait time, a scheduler, and a screen for chatting with an agent by instant message.

Like Quick Assist, Get Help is updated through Windows Update, not Microsoft Store, even though Get Help is built from the Universal Windows Platform.

See also
help (command)

References

Windows software